The Bachelorette India (tagline: Mere Khayaalon ki Mallika) is an Indian television reality show. which featured Bollywood actor Mallika Sherawat who set out to find "the perfect bachelor" for herself.

It aired on Life OK.

References

Life OK original programming
Indian reality television series
2013 Indian television series debuts
2013 Indian television series endings
India
Indian television series based on American television series